The Proletarian Unity League was formed in Boston in 1975 by Students for a Democratic Society (SDS) members who had been associated with the Revolutionary Youth Movement II grouping that emerged from the split in SDS at its summer 1969 convention.  The Proletarian Unity League (PUL) was critical of what it saw as ultraleftism among American anti-revisionist groups.  In 1985 it merged with the Revolutionary Workers Headquarters and formed the Freedom Road Socialist Organization (which Organization for Revolutionary Unity joined in 1986).

Publications by The Proletarian Unity League include:

 Mitchell, Roxanne and Frank Weiss. Two, Three, Many Parties of a New Type? Against the Ultra-Left Line. Publisher: United Labor Press (1977).
 Proletarian Unity League.  On the October League's call for a new communist party. A response.  United Labor Press.  New York.  1976.
 Forward Motion magazine.

Anti-revisionist organizations
Defunct Maoist organizations in the United States
1975 establishments in Massachusetts
1985 disestablishments in the United States